Glomerella tucumanensis is a species of fungus in the family Glomerellaceae.

References

Fungi described in 1896
Fungal plant pathogens and diseases
Sordariomycetes enigmatic taxa